Jenelle is a given name. Notable people with the name include:

 Jenelle Crooks (born 1994), Australian racing cyclist
 Jenelle Cunningham (born 1990), Trinidad and Tobago football defender
 Jenelle Hutcherson (born 1985), American hair artist, activist, public figure, designer, youth mentor and visionary
 Jenelle Kohanchuk (born 1990), American ice hockey forward
 Jenelle Porter, American art curator and author of exhibition catalogs and essays
 Jenelle Riley (born 1972), American screenwriter, actress, journalist, and producer
 Jenell Slack-Wilson (born 1984), American actress